Warren Davis may refer to:
Warren R. Davis (1793–1835), American attorney and representative
Warren Davis (basketball) (born 1943), basketball player
Warren Davis (actor), American actor and classic arcade game inventor
Warren Davis (broadcaster) (1926–1995), Canadian television journalist
Warren B. Davis (1865–1928), American painter and illustrator
John Warren Davis (judge) (1867–1945), American politician and judge
John Warren Davis (1888–1980), African American educator, college administrator, and civil rights leader